Eirik Johannessen (born 30 July 1933) is a Norwegian former sailor who competed in the 1964 Summer Olympics, in the 1968 Summer Olympics, and in the 1972 Summer Olympics.

References

1933 births
Living people
Norwegian male sailors (sport)
Olympic sailors of Norway
Sailors at the 1964 Summer Olympics – 5.5 Metre
Sailors at the 1968 Summer Olympics – 5.5 Metre
Sailors at the 1972 Summer Olympics – Soling